Otis is a 2008 direct-to-DVD comedy horror film directed by Tony Krantz. It is the fourth Raw Feed horror film from Warner Home Video.

Plot
In the midst of a serial killer's rampage and kidnappings, beautiful young Riley Lawson goes missing. When her desperate parents, Will and Kate, are contacted by her kidnapper, insufferable FBI Special Agent Hotchkiss takes charge of the case.

But, from deep within the psychopathic subterranean world created by Otis Broth, Riley turns the tables on her tormentor, manages to escape and to contact her parents. Fed up with the inability of the FBI to find their girl, Will, Kate, and Riley's brother, Reed decide to take matters – and revenge – into their own hands.

Cast

External links
 
 
 

2008 films
2008 comedy horror films
2000s serial killer films
American black comedy films
American comedy horror films
Films shot in California
Films shot in Los Angeles
American independent films
American serial killer films
Warner Bros. films
Films produced by Daniel Myrick
Films about the Federal Bureau of Investigation
Films about kidnapping
2000s English-language films
Films directed by Tony Krantz
2000s American films